The Type 43 was a proposed destroyer class for the Royal Navy. It was intended to follow on from the Type 42 but armed with the Sea Dart Mark II missile. The primary role of the Type 43 was to protect a task force from air-launched missile attack. There were two proposed variants - the small variant and the large variant. The project advanced to feasibility design before being cancelled in 1981.

Small variant
The design for the small variant Type 43 resembled a Type 42 with one twin Sea Dart launcher forward and directors fore and aft.

Large variant
The design for the large variant Type 43 had twin Sea Dart launchers both forward and aft with four radar directors. Also, two GWS.25 Seawolf launchers were located forward and aft. With launchers at both ends the flight deck was relocated midships between the two superstructure blocks. The helicopter hangar would have room for one Merlin or two Lynx helicopters.

Type 44
The Type 44 was proposed as a similar to the small variant Type 43, but with enhanced anti-submarine capability.

Cancellation
The Type 43/44 programme was cancelled by the Secretary of State for Defence John Nott in the 1981 defence review.

References
 
 

Destroyer classes
Proposed ships of the Royal Navy
Ship classes of the Royal Navy
Abandoned military projects of the United Kingdom